The 1922 Texas Longhorns football team represented the University of Texas at Austin in the 1922 college football season.  In their third and final year under head coach Berry Whitaker, the Longhorns compiled a 7–2 record and outscored all opponents by a collective total of 202 to 68.

Schedule

References

Texas
Texas Longhorns football seasons
Texas Longhorns football